Jungle warfare is a term used to cover the special techniques needed for military units to survive and fight in jungle terrain.

It has been the topic of extensive study by military strategists, and was an important part of the planning for both sides in many conflicts, including World War II and the Vietnam War.

The jungle has a variety of effects on military operations. Dense vegetation can limit lines of sight and arcs of fire, but can also provide ample opportunity for camouflage and plenty of material with which to build fortifications.

Jungle terrain, often without good roads, can be inaccessible to vehicles and so makes logistical supply and transport difficult, which in turn places a premium on air mobility. The problems of transport make engineering resources important as they are needed to improve roads, build bridges and airfields, and improve water supplies.

Jungle environments can also be inherently unhealthy, with various tropical diseases that have to be prevented or treated by medical services. Likewise the terrain can make it difficult to deploy armoured forces, or any other kind of forces on any large scale. Successful jungle fighting emphasises effective small unit tactics and leadership.

History

Pre-modern Jungle Warfare
Throughout world history, forests have played significant roles in many of the most historic battles. For example, in the Battle of the Teutoburg Forest between the Romans and the Germanic tribes in 9 CE, the Germans used the forest to ambush the Romans. In ancient China, the Chinese Empire planted forests on its strategic borderland to thwart nomadic attacks. For example, the Northern Song Dynasty (960-1127) constructed and maintained an extensive defensive forest in present-day Hebei.

Nicaragua Guerrilla

World War II

Conventional jungle warfare

At the start of Pacific War in the Far East, the Japanese Imperial Forces were able to advance on all fronts. In the Malayan Campaign, time and again they infiltrated through the jungle to bypass static British positions based on road blocks so that they could cut the British supply line and attack their defences from all sides.

In early 1942, the fighting in Burma at the start of the Burma Campaign took on a similar aspect and resulted in one of the longest retreats in British military history. Most members of the British Indian Army left Burma with the belief that the Japanese were unstoppable in the jungle.

The Chindits were a special force of 3,500 that in February 1942 launched a deep penetration raid, code-named Operation Longcloth, into Japanese occupied Burma. They went in on foot and used mules to carry supplies. The operation was not a military success but was a propaganda boost for the Allies because it showed that Allied forces could successfully move and fight in jungle terrain well away from roads. On the back of the propaganda success, Orde Wingate, the eccentric commander of the Chindits, was given the resources to increase his command to divisional size and the USAAF supplied the 1st Air Commando Group to support his operations. The availability of air transport revolutionized Wingate's operational choices. In February 1944, Operation Thursday was launched, and air transport support supplied 1st Air to allow the Chindits to set up air supplied bases deep behind enemy lines from which aggressive combat patrols could be sent out to interdict Japanese supply lines and disrupt rear echelon forces. That in turn forced the Japanese 18th Division to pull frontline troops from the battle against X Force, which was advancing through Northern Burma, to protect the men building the Ledo Road. When the Japanese closed on a base and got within artillery range, the base could be abandoned and then set up in another remote location. The ability to sustain the bases that relied totally on air power in the coming decades would prove a template for many similar operations.

After the first Chindits expedition, thanks to the training the regular forces were receiving and the example of the Chindits and new divisional tactics, the regular units of the Fourteenth Army started to get the measure of both the jungle and the enemy. When the Japanese launched their late 1943 Arakan offensive they infiltrated Allied lines to attack the 7th Indian Infantry Division from the rear, overrunning the divisional HQ. Unlike previous occasions on which this had happened, the Allied forces stood firm against the attack and supplies were dropped to them by parachute. In the Battle of the Admin Box from 5 February to 23 February, the Japanese were unable to break through the heavily-defended perimeter of the box. The Japanese switched their attack to the central front, but again, the British fell back into defensive box of Imphal and the Kohima redoubt. In falling back to the defensive positions around Imphal, the leading British formations found their retreat cut by Japanese forces, but unlike previously, they took that attitude that the Japanese who were behind them were just as cut off as the British. The situation maps of the fighting along the roads leading to Imphal resembled a slice of marble cake, as both sides used the jungle to outflank each other. Another major change by the British was that use of air support both as an offensive weapon to replace artillery and as a logistical tool to transport men and equipment. For example, the 5th Indian Infantry Division was airlifted straight from the now-quieter Arakan front up to the central front and were in action within days of arriving. By the end of the campaigning season, both Kohima and Imphal had been relieved, and the Japanese were in full retreat.

The lessons learnt in Burma on how to fight in the jungle and how to use air transport to move troops around would lay the foundations of how to conduct large-scale jungle campaigns in future wars.

Unconventional jungle warfare
Immediately after the fall of Malaya and Singapore in 1942, a few British officers, such as Freddie Spencer Chapman, eluded capture and escaped into the central Malaysian jungle, where they helped to organize and train bands of lightly-armed local ethnic Chinese communists into a capable guerrilla force against the Japanese occupiers. What began as desperate initiatives by several determined British officers probably inspired the subsequent formation of the above-mentioned early jungle-warfare forces.

The British and the Australians contributed to the development of jungle warfare as the unconventional, low-intensity, guerrilla-style type of warfare understood today. V Force and Force 136 were composed of small bodies of soldiers and irregulars, equipped with no more than small arms and explosives but were rigorously trained in guerrilla warfare-style tactics, particularly in close-quarter combat, and fought behind enemy lines. They were joined in Burma by American led Kachin guerrillas were armed and coordinated by the American liaison organisation, OSS Detachment 101, which led,  armed, and co-ordinated them.

Another small force operating in the Far East was the Australian led Z Special Unit, which carried out a total of 81 covert operations in the South West Pacific theatre, some of which involved jungle warfare.

Cold War

British experience during Malayan Emergency
After the war, early skills in jungle warfare were further honed in the Malayan Emergency, when in 1948 guerrilla fighters of the Malayan Communist Party (MCP) turned against the Commonwealth. In addition to jungle discipline, field craft, and survival skills, special tactics such as combat tracking (first using native trackers), close-quarter fighting (tactics were developed by troopers who were protected only with fencing masks and stalked and shot each other in the jungle training ground with air rifles), small team operations (which led to the typical four-man special operations teams) and tree jumping (parachuting into the jungle and through the rain forest canopy) were developed from Borneo's bative Iban people to actively take the war to the Communist guerrillas, instead of reacting to incidents that were initiated by them.

Of greater importance was the integration of the tactical jungle warfare with the strategic "winning hearts and minds" psychological, economic, and political warfare as a complete counter-insurgency package. The Malayan Emergency was declared over in 1960, as the surviving Communist guerrillas were driven to the jungle near the Thai border, where they remained until they gave up their armed struggle in 1989.

Cuban Revolution and Che Guevara

Brazilian military government guerrilla

Portuguese Colonial War

 
In the 1960s and early 1970s, Portugal was engaged in jungle warfare operations in Africa against the independentist guerrillas of Angola, Portuguese Guinea and Mozambique. The operations were part of what is collectively known as the "Portuguese Colonial War". In fact, there were three different wars: the Angolan Independence War, the Guinea-Bissau War of Independence and the Mozambican War of Independence. The situation was unique in that small armed forces, those of Portugal, conducted three large-scale counterinsurgency wars at the same time, each in a different theatre of operations and separated by thousands of kilometres from the others. For those operations, Portugal developed its own counterinsurgency and jungle warfare doctrines. In the counterinsurgency operations, the Portuguese organized their forces into two main types, the grid (quadrilha) units and the intervention units. The grid units were each in charge of a given area of responsibility in which they were responsible to protect and keep the local populations from influence from the guerrillas. The intervention forces, mostly composed of special units (paratroopers, marines, commandos etc.) were highly-mobile units that were used to conduct strategic offensive operations against the guerrillas or to temporary reinforcing grid units under heavy attack.

Vietnam War
The British experience in counterinsurgency was passed onto the Americans during their involvement in the Vietnam War, where the battlegrounds were again the jungle. Much British strategic thinking on counterinsurgency tactics in a jungle environment was passed on through BRIAM (British Advisory Mission) to South Vietnam headed by Sir Robert Thompson, a former Chindit and the Permanent Secretary of Defense for Malaya during the Emergency.

The Americans further refined jungle warfare by the creation of such dedicated counterinsurgency special operations troops as the Special Forces (Green Berets), Rangers, Long Range Reconnaissance Patrols (LRRP), and Combat Tracker Teams (CTT).

During the decade of active US combat involvement in the Vietnam War (1962–1972), jungle warfare became closely associated with counter insurgency and special operations troops.

However, although the American forces managed to have mastered jungle warfare at a tactical level in Vietnam, they were unable to install a successful strategic program in winning a jungle-based guerrilla war. Hence, the American military lost the political war in Vietnam even though US forces, especially special operations troops, won almost every major military battle against the Viet Cong guerrillas and the North Vietnamese Army.

With the end of the Vietnam War, jungle warfare fell into disfavor among the major armies in the world, namely, those of the US-ledNATO and the Soviet-led Warsaw Pact, which focused their attention to conventional warfare with a nuclear flavor that was to be fought on the jungleless European battlefields.

US special operations troops that were created for the purpose of fighting in the jungle environment, such as LRRP and CTT, were disbanded, and other jungle-warfare-proficient troops, such as the Special Forces and Rangers, went through a temporary period of decline until they found their role in counterterrorism operations in the 1980s.

Central American Crisis

After Cold War
The end of the Soviet Union in the early 1990s marked the beginning of the end of a number of proxy wars that had been fought between the superpowers in the jungles of Africa, South America, and Southeast Asia. In the euphoria at the end of the Cold War, many Western nations were quick to claim the peace dividend and reinvested resources to other priorities.

Jungle warfare was reduced in scope and priority in the regular training curriculum of most conventional Western armies. The nature of major military operations in the Middle East and Central Asia saw the need to put an emphasis upon desert warfare and urban warfare training in both the conventional and the unconventional warfare models.

Conflicts in Colombia, Ecuador, and Peru

Chittagong Hill Tracts

Marawi

Jungle units

At present the following armies have specialised jungle units:
 : the Argentine Army has four companies of Cazadores de Monte (Jungle Hunters).
 : the Brazilian Army has four Jungle Infantry Brigades: 1st, 16th, 17th and 23rd Jungle Infantry Brigades and others units, grouped in two divisions, and the Jungle Warfare Training Center (CIGS). Brazilian Special Forces, Commandos, Parachute Infantry and Marine Corps are trained in jungle warfare too. The SOF of some State Military Police Forces, like the Military Police of São Paulo's Comandos e Operações Especiais, the Military Police of Minas Gerais's Batalhão de Operações Especiais (BOPE)/COMAF, the Military Police of Rio de Janeiro's Batalhão de Operações Policiais Especiais (which has an agreement with the CIGS) and the Military Police of Maranhão's Companhia de Operações de Sobrevivência em Área Rural (COSAR) has training or are specialized in jungle operations. Jungle artillery is made by the 1st and the 10th Jungle Field Artillery Group.
 : Royal Brunei Armed Forces, Royal Brunei Police Forces.
 : Brigada de Fuerzas Especiales, Batallones de Selva.
 : the Ecuadorian Army maintains three units composed of jungle troops: the 17th, 19th and 21st Jungle Infantry Brigades (Brigadas de Infantería de Selva). In addition, it has an independent jungle battalion with personnel recruited from the native population of the jungle: the 23rd Special Operations Training Battalion (Batallón Escuela de Operaciones Especiales 23, or BEOES 23). It has also a training school for jungle operations, the Escuela de Selva "Cap. Giovanny Calles".
 :
 French Army
 the 3rd Foreign Infantry Regiment based in Kourou, French Guiana and 9th Marine Infantry Regiment in Cayenne along with Gendarmerie and other detachments.
 :
 Indonesian Army
 Kopassus is the main commando and special forces unit of the Indonesian Army, it basically specializes in Jungle warfare. Other roles carried out by the unit are: Raid, Airborne, Combat intelligence, Counter-insurgency, Counter-terrorism and other special operation tasks.
 Kostrad is the Indonesian Army's strategic command corps which has several Airborne infantry brigades that are Raider-qualified.   
Combat Reconnaissance Platoon (Tontaipur) are Kostrad's special unit which expertise in Reconnaissance operations, it is trained in jungle warfare in accordance with the terrain of the tropical country. 
Raider Battalions (Yonif Raider) are Indonesian Army's elite infantry battalions which are specially trained in Raid and Air assault operations (including counter-terrorism, Extraction, Guerrilla and Close combat operations). Jungle warfare are its basic capabilities. 
Indonesian Navy
 Indonesian Marine Corps' infantry brigades are trained in jungle warfare
 Taifib is the Indonesian Marine Corps' elite-Amphibious reconnaissance unit which specializes both jungle and marine combat warfare 
Kopaska is the main frogman and Underwater demolition unit of the Indonesian Navy which also has abilities in conducting Jungle warfare, although it is not regarded as one if its primary tasks, recruits who join the unit are required to pass Jungle warfare training
Indonesian Air Force
 Paskhas is the air force infantry and special forces of the Indonesian Air Force which also have abilities in jungle warfare. Although it specializes in air-oriented operations and Airfield defense, it also conducts infantry operations for the Indonesian Air Force. 
Indonesian National Police
 Brimob (Mobile Brigade Corps) is the special police operations force and paramilitary law enforcement of Indonesia under the INP or Polri. Although it is primarily tasked for high-risk law enforcement activities and riot control, it also have abilities in jungle warfare for the purposes to capture and arrest terrorists or armed-criminals which settle within jungle terrains. Such operations are usually conducted with the TNI such as Operation Tinombala.  
 :
 COBRA (acronym for Commando Battalion for Resolute Action) is a specialized unit of the Central Reserve Police Force created to counter the Naxalite problem in India. This specialized CRPF unit is one of the few units of the Central Armed Police Forces in the country who are specifically trained in guerrilla warfare. This elite fighting unit has been trained to track, hunt and eliminate small Naxalite groups. There are currently 10 COBRA units. 
 The Indian Army maintains an elite Counter Insurgency and Jungle Warfare School which is used to train domestic and foreign units in methods for countering irregular warfare. 21st Battalion of Parachute Regiment (India) were originally trained for use in jungle warfare.
Indian  Para SF is very good at jungle warfare and "21 para SF" is specially trained for jungle warfare and CI/CT duties. Para SF also conducted surgical strike into Myanmar in 2015. Indian Para SF has given us many jungle warriors : Col. Santosh Mahadik, Major Mohit Sharma, etc.
 The MARCOS, the special operations unit of Indian Navy is well trained in jungle warfare.
 : has the following specialized units:
 Malaysian Armed Forces:
Gerup Gerak Khas
Royal Ranger Regiment
Royal Malay Regiment
 Royal Malaysia Police forces:
69 Commandos of the Pasukan Gerakan Khas
General Operations Force; including Senoi Praaq
 : Mexican Special Forces, Brigada de Fusileros Paracaidistas.
 : the Korps Commandotroepen, 11 Luchtmobiele Brigade, Unit Interventie Mariniers and the Netherlands Marine Corps are jungle trained
 
 Myanmar Armed Forces:
Light Infantry Divisions
  
Philippine National Police
Special Action Force
Regional Public Safety Battalion
Provincial Public Safety Company
Philippine Army
Philippine Army Scout Rangers
Philippine Army Special Forces
Philippine Navy
Naval Special Operations Command
Philippine Marine Corps
Marine Special Operations Group
 
 Royal Thai Armed Forces:
Royal Thai Army Special Warfare Command
RTMC Reconnaissance Battalion
Royal Thai Police
Border Patrol Police
 : the British Army has a Gurkha Battalion stationed in Brunei, where it can maintain jungle skills.  Army infantry and Royal Marine units routinely attend courses and training, as do the Special Air Service.
 : the amphibian assault platoons of the Kommando Spezialkräfte are trained in jungle warfare
 : U.S Army’s 25th Infantry Division is the primary jungle warfare unit in its size. The 25th Infantry Division also conducts military operations primarily in the Asia-Pacific region.

Jungle Warfare Training

India
The Counter Insurgency and Jungle Warfare School (CIJWS) located at Vairengte, Mizoram, India is one of the world's premiere military institutes imparting training in jungle warfare.

Brazil
Jungle Warfare Training Center (CIGS), in Brazil, is a Jungle Warfare School where they sought to copy the capacities of units of homologous commands.

United States
 
The current U.S. Jungle Operations Training Center (JOTC) located at Schofield Barracks, Hawaii is one of the newest jungle training centers in the world having been opened in 2013. JOTC is operated by the 25th Infantry Division to reaffirm their position as the United States Jungle Division. They primarily train soldiers and leaders of the 25th Infantry Division, Special Operation Forces, and Foreign Partners. Hawaii was chosen as the location for JOTC due to its climate, geography, capacity, and operational history in jungle training within the Pacific. Jungle warfare training is not new to this organization in Hawaii or the United States. During World War II the Jungle Warfare Training Center, also known as the Pacific Combat Training Center, was established in Hawaii to teach soldiers survival and fighting skills in tropical environments. Over 300,000 U.S. Military personnel were trained in jungle fighting prior to deploying throughout the Pacific. Between 1956 and 1965, this same installation in Hawaii was home to the Jungle and Guerilla Warfare Training Center followed by the Recondo School from 1971 to 1979. The United States' Asia-Pacific Rebalance Strategy necessitated jungle warfare training for the U.S. Military be increased in priority. JOTC's revival at its original location in Hawaii is in part due to closure of the Fort Sherman, Panama JOTC location in 1999 (The majority of jungle specific training was transitioned to Fort Sherman, Panama during 1970's).

Notes

References

Further reading

External links
Jungle, Japanese and the Australian Army: learning the lessons of New Guinea
Combat Tracker Teams: Dodging an Elusive Enemy
Jungle Survival tips
U.S. WWII Newsmap featuring Jungle Warfare, hosted by the UNT Libraries Digital Collections
Counter Insurgency Jungle Warfare School (CIJWS)India
 A 1989 U.S. Army news archive about the 7th Infantry Division (Light) participating in Jungle Warfare training.
 Praaq Special Forces

Jungle warfare